The following is a list of episodes for the NBC television series The Pretender. The series ran for four seasons from 1996 through 2000, with 86 episodes produced, plus two television film sequels that aired on TNT in 2001.

Series overview

Episodes

Season 1 (1996–97)

Season 2 (1997–98)

Season 3 (1998–99)

Season 4 (1999–2000)

Television films (2001)

External links
 

Lists of American action television series episodes